The 1999 Ball State Cardinals football team was an American football team that represented Ball State University in the West Division of the Mid-American Conference (MAC) during the 1999 NCAA Division I-A football season. In its fifth season under head coach Bill Lynch, the team compiled a 0–11 record (0–8 against conference opponents) and finished in sixth place out of six teams in the MAC West. The team played its home games at Ball State Stadium in Muncie, Indiana.

The team's statistical leaders included Brian Conn with 1,525 passing yards, Nick Dunbar with 592 rushing yards, and Adrian Reese with 664 receiving yards and 30 points scored.

Schedule

References

Ball State
Ball State Cardinals football seasons
College football winless seasons
Ball State Cardinals football